George Nicholas Bascom (1837 – February 21, 1862) was a United States Army officer in the Arizona Territory and in the early months of the American Civil War.

Biography
George N. Bascom was born in Owingsville in Bath County, Kentucky. His ancestors were of French Huguenot and French Basque. Bascom was appointed to the United States Military Academy at West Point, and graduated 26th in a class of 27 in 1858. Following his graduation he was first stationed at Camp Floyd in Utah and then in Arizona at Fort Buchanan as a 2nd Lieutenant of the U.S. 7th Infantry Regiment. In January 1861 he was involved in what became known as the Bascom Affair at Apache Pass, that is considered to be the key event in triggering the 1861–1872 Apache War.

After the American Civil War began, Bascom, was promoted to captain, of the U.S. 16th Infantry Regiment. However, before he could return to join his new regiment, the three companies of the 7th Infantry that had moved to Fort Craig were involved in the Battle of Val Verde in New Mexico Territory. Bascom was killed in action by Confederate forces on February 21, 1862, during the battle.  Subsequently, Fort Bascom, New Mexico, was named in his honor.

Captain Bascom was originally buried at nearby Fort Craig, in the post cemetery. When the Fort Craig was closed in 1885, all the bodies were reburied at the Santa Fe National Cemetery. Bascom's burial was one of that was not identifiable and is believed to be one of the unknown markers.

The actor Dick Simmons portrayed Bascom in the 1966 episode, "The Hero of Apache Pass", on the syndicated television anthology series, Death Valley Days, hosted by Robert Taylor. Charles Bateman was cast as Army surgeon Bernard J. D. Irwin, early recipient of the Medal of Honor based on daring exploits in an 1861 confrontation with the Apache Chief Cochise in the Arizona Territory. Phillip Pine was cast as Colonel Pitts, and Don Keefer played the post commandant.

See also
 Apache Pass Station
 Butterfield Overland Mail in New Mexico Territory

References

External links
 Tripod.com
 Militaryhistoryonline.com
 Discoverseaz.com (reference only)
 THE BASCOM AFFAIR, APACHE PASS, February 4, 1861
   History lecture on Captain Bascom and Fort Bascom

1837 births
1862 deaths
United States Military Academy alumni
People of Kentucky in the American Civil War
People from Owingsville, Kentucky
American people of the Indian Wars
United States Army officers
Apache Wars
Union Army officers
Union military personnel killed in the American Civil War
Burials at Santa Fe National Cemetery